Hempstead Meadow is a   Local Nature Reserve in Uckfield in East Sussex. It is owned and managed by  Uckfield Town Council.

The site is mainly wet grassland with scattered trees and scrub. Flora include primroses, tussock sedge and various ferns. The meadow is used as a foraging area by bats.

There is access from Waitrose carpark off the High Street.

References

Local Nature Reserves in East Sussex